Flint River may refer to:

Jamaica
Flint River (Hanover, Jamaica)
Flint River (St. Mary, Jamaica)

United States
Flint River (Alabama)
Flint River (Georgia)
Flint River (Iowa)
Flint River (Michigan)